Elise Marie Stefanik (born July 2, 1984) is an American politician serving as the U.S. representative for  since 2015. As chair of the House Republican Conference since 2021, she is the third-ranking House Republican. Stefanik's district covers most of the North Country and the Adirondack Mountains, some of the outer suburbs of Utica and the Capital District in New York. Stefanik was 30 when first elected in the 2014 U.S. House of Representatives elections in New York (District 21), the youngest woman elected to Congress at the time.

Initially elected as a moderate conservative, Stefanik has shifted increasingly to the political right, aligning herself with then-President Donald Trump. She strongly opposed the first impeachment of Trump in 2019 amid the Trump–Ukraine scandal and backed Trump's attempts to overturn the 2020 United States presidential election, objecting to Pennsylvania's electoral votes after Trump supporters were involved in the 2021 United States Capitol attack. As the U.S. House Select Committee on the January 6 Attack began to investigate, Stefanik said that Speaker Nancy Pelosi was responsible. Stefanik claimed without evidence that Pelosi was "aware of potential security threats to the Capitol and she failed to act". Stefanik was elected chair of the House Republican Conference in May 2021 after incumbent Liz Cheney was removed due to her opposition to Trump. Stefanik has come under heavy criticism for her strong support of controversial Representative George Santos.

Early life and education 
Elise Marie Stefanik was born in Albany, New York, on July 2, 1984, to Melanie and Ken Stefanik. Her parents own Premium Plywood Products, a wholesale plywood distributor based in Guilderland Center.

In October 1998, when she was 14, Stefanik was featured in a Times Union profile about U.S. Senator Al D'Amato. In the article she is quoted saying, "I support the Republican view, especially his". Stefanik worked in Washington for six years before entering politics. According to Stefanik, she first considered a career in public service and policy in the aftermath of the September 11 attacks.

Stefanik graduated from the Albany Academy for Girls and enrolled at Harvard College, graduating with a Bachelor of Arts degree in government in 2006. She was elected vice president of the Harvard Institute of Politics in 2004. At Harvard, she received an honorable mention for the Women's Leadership Award.

Early career and personal life 

After graduating from Harvard, she joined the George W. Bush administration, as a staff member for the U.S. Domestic Policy Council. Stefanik later worked in the office of Joshua Bolten, the White House Chief of Staff. In 2009, she founded the blog American Maggie, a platform to promote the views of "conservative and Republican women", named after British Prime Minister Margaret Thatcher.

Stefanik helped prepare the Republican platform in 2012, served as director of new media for Tim Pawlenty's presidential exploratory committee and worked at the Foundation for Defense of Democracies and Foreign Policy Initiative. She managed Representative Paul Ryan's debate preparation for the 2012 presidential debates. After Mitt Romney and Ryan lost the 2012 presidential election, she returned to upstate New York and joined her parents' business.

After the 2012 election, Stefanik bought a home in Willsboro, near Plattsburgh. Her parents had owned a vacation home in Willsboro for many years. By April 2014, she owned a minority interest in a townhouse near Capitol Hill in Washington, D.C., valued at $1.3 million.

On August 19, 2017, in Saratoga Springs, New York, Stefanik married Matthew Manda, who works in marketing and communications. In December 2018, Stefanik and Manda moved to Schuylerville, near Saratoga Springs. , Manda works as the manager of public affairs for the National Shooting Sports Foundation, a trade association for firearms manufacturers. Their first child was born in 2021. Stefanik is a Roman Catholic.

U.S. House of Representatives

Elections

2014 

The district had been in Republican hands for 100 years, before Democrat Bill Owens was elected to represent it in a 2009 special election. In January 2014, Owens announced that he would not seek reelection. Doug Hoffman, the Conservative Party nominee in 2009, endorsed Stefanik.

Stefanik defeated Matt Doheny in the 2014 Republican primary election, 61% to 39%. She faced Aaron Woolf, the Democratic Party nominee, and Matt Funiciello, the Green Party nominee, in the November 4 general election. Stefanik won with 55% of the vote to their 34% and 11%, respectively. At age 30, she became the youngest woman ever elected to Congress at the time.

2016 

Stefanik ran for reelection in 2016. She became increasingly supportive of Donald Trump's candidacy for president after he won the 2016 Republican Party presidential primary. Stefanik said that Trump's crude remarks in the Access Hollywood tape were "wrong" but continued to endorse him.

Stefanik faced Democratic nominee Mike Derrick and Green Party nominee Matt Funiciello in the general election. She won with 66% of the vote to Derrick's 29% and Funiciello's 5%.

2018 

In 2017, former ambassador to the United Nations John Bolton endorsed Stefanik for reelection, lauding her work on the House Armed Services Committee. Stefanik was reelected with 56% of the vote to Democratic nominee Tedra Cobb's 42% and Green Party nominee Lynn Kahn's 1.5%.

2020 

Stefanik defeated Tedra Cobb with 59% of the vote to Cobb's 41%.

Tenure 

In January 2015, Stefanik was appointed to the House Armed Services Committee. The freshman representatives of the 114th Congress elected her to serve as the freshman representative to the policy committee. In February 2015, she was appointed vice chair of the House Armed Services Committee's Subcommittee on Readiness. She was invited to join the Senior Advisory Committee at the Harvard Institute of Politics shortly after her election. Stefanik was removed from the committee in 2021 following her objection to Pennsylvania's electoral votes after the storming of the U.S. Capitol.

On January 11, 2017, Stefanik announced that she had been elected co-chair of the Tuesday Group, "a caucus of ... moderate House Republicans from across the country".

Stefanik led recruitment for the National Republican Congressional Committee (NRCC) in the 2018 House elections; among 13 Republican women elected to the House, only one was newly elected. In December 2018, Stefanik announced she would leave the NRCC to create a "leadership PAC" dedicated to recruiting Republican women to run for office. This group, named Elevate PAC (E-PAC), announced in an October 22 press conference that it had partially funded the primary campaigns of 11 Republican women from various states. In the 2020 House elections, 18 of the 30 women endorsed by Stefanik's E-PAC were elected.

On May 19, 2021, Stefanik and all other House Republican leaders voted against establishing a January 6 commission. 35 Republican House members and all 217 Democrats present voted to establish such a commission.

Committee assignments 
Stefanik's committee assignments include:

Committee on Armed Services
Subcommittee on Intelligence, Emerging Threats, and Capabilities (Ranking Member)
Committee on Education and the Workforce
Subcommittee on Civil Rights and Human Services
Subcommittee on Workforce Protections
Subcommittee on Higher Education and Workforce Training
United States House Permanent Select Committee on Intelligence

Party leadership campaign 
In early 2021, after House Republican Conference Chair Liz Cheney supported Trump's second impeachment and refuted his claims that the election was stolen from him, some Republicans in Congress who supported Trump called for her removal. Stefanik was seen as a potential replacement for Cheney if the Republican conference decided to oust Cheney from her position, despite Cheney's more conservative credentials and greater voting record in support of Trump's policies. On May 5, Stefanik received the endorsement of Trump and House Minority Whip Steve Scalise to replace Cheney as conference chair. During a May 6 appearance on a podcast hosted by Steve Bannon, Stefanik repeatedly emphasized the need for the Republican Party to work with Trump. Representative Chip Roy challenged Stefanik from the right in a bid to replace Cheney, but was denounced by Trump, who reiterated his endorsement of Stefanik. On May 14, Stefanik was elected House Republican Conference chair. After her victory, Stefanik thanked Trump, saying, "President Trump is the leader that [Republican voters] look to".

After the 2022 elections, Stefanik was reelected as conference chair, defeating Byron Donalds.

Media campaign against Jim Banks 
On May 28, 2022, Politico reported that Stefanik had been responsible for planting negative stories about Jim Banks, a potential competitor for Stefanik and his aide Buckley Carlson, Tucker Carlson's son. This was met with displeasure by allies of Donald Trump Jr., who made it known to Stefanik that her attacks on Carlson's son had crossed a line.

Caucus memberships 
Tuesday Group (20172019)
Republican Main Street Partnership 
Climate Solutions Caucus

Political positions 
Stefanik was ranked the 19th-most bipartisan House member during the first session of the 115th United States Congress by the Bipartisan Index. The conservative advocacy group Heritage Action gave her a lifetime score of 48% but an 84% score since the 117th Congress began in January 2021, compared to an average of 95% among House Republicans during that session. The American Conservative Union gave Stefanik a lifetime rating of 44%. The conservative Club for Growth gave her a lifetime rating of 35%, lower than Squad member Ilhan Omar's.

Abortion 
Stefanik opposes abortion, but says the Republican Party (GOP) should be more understanding of other positions on the issue. She opposes taxpayer funding for abortion, and supports requiring that health insurance plans disclose whether they cover it. In 2019, The National Right to Life Committee, a political action committee (PAC) opposed to legal abortion, gave Stefanik a 71% rating, and NARAL Pro-Choice America, a PAC that supports legal abortion, gave her a 28% rating. She joined her party in supporting H.R. 36, the Pain-Capable Unborn Child Protection Act of 2017.

COVID-19 vaccine 
Stefanik opposes federal COVID-19 vaccine mandates for private employers. Along with approximately 170 other members of Congress, she signed an amicus brief to the Supreme Court arguing that Congress did not give the government authority to impose a vaccine mandate.

Economy 
Stefanik voted in favor of the Keystone Pipeline. She opposed the 2013 sequestration cuts to the federal U.S. military budget, citing its effect on Fort Drum just north of Watertown, New York, part of her district.

Stefanik voted against the Tax Cuts and Jobs Act of 2017, joining five other New York Republican representatives. Her primary reason for voting against the law was its changes to the state and local tax deduction "that so many in our district and across New York rely on". Stefanik also criticized "Albany's failed leadership and inability to rein in spending". She said, "New York is one of the highest taxed states in the country, and families here rely on this important deduction to make ends meet. Failure to maintain SALT (state and local tax deductions) could lead to more families leaving our region."

In March 2021, all House Republicans, including Stefanik, voted against the American Rescue Plan Act of 2021, a $1.9 trillion COVID-19 relief bill.

Donald Trump 
An analysis by FiveThirtyEight in early 2017 found Stefanik supporting Trump's position in 77.7% of House votes from the 115th to the 117th Congress. Stefanik has been described as a Trump loyalist.

In May 2021, Stefanik called Trump the "strongest supporter of any president when it comes to standing up for the Constitution."

First Trump impeachment 

On September 25, 2019, Stefanik announced that she did not support the impeachment of President Trump. During the November 2019 hearings, in which Congress gathered evidence and heard witness testimony in relation to the impeachment inquiry, Stefanik emerged as a key defender of Trump. During a November 15 hearing, intelligence committee ranking member Devin Nunes attempted to yield part of his allotted witness questioning time to Stefanik, but was ruled out of order by committee chairman Adam Schiff. Stefanik accused Schiff of "making up the rules as he goes" and of preventing Republican committee members from controlling their time to question witnesses. Nunes and Stefanik were violating the procedural rules that were established by an October House vote, and Schiff cited the rule to them. The rule Schiff cited authorized only Schiff and Nunes, or their counsels, to ask questions during the first 45 minutes of each party's questions for witnesses. The incident created a controversy in which Stefanik and others, including Trump, accused Schiff of "gagging" her. The Washington Post and other sources characterized the incident as a "stunt" to portray Schiff as unfair.

2020 election fraud conspiracy theories 
After Joe Biden won the 2020 presidential election and Trump refused to concede while making false claims of fraud, Stefanik aided Trump in his efforts to overturn the election results. She also made false claims of fraud, saying among other things that "more than 140,000 votes came from underage, deceased, and otherwise unauthorized voters" in Fulton County, Georgia. She also expressed "concerns" about Dominion Voting Systems, the subject of numerous false right-wing conspiracy theories. In December 2020, Stefanik supported the lawsuit Texas v. Pennsylvania, an attempt to reverse Trump's loss by petitioning the U.S. Supreme Court to reject certified results in Michigan, Pennsylvania, Wisconsin and Georgia. After a mob of pro-Trump supporters stormed the U.S. Capitol on January 6, 2021, Stefanik condemned the violence but rejected the idea that Trump was at fault. She has promoted conspiracy theories about a "stolen election", and just hours after the invasion of the Capitol, she voted against accepting Pennsylvania's electoral votes in the 2020 election. Later in January, she expressed opposition to impeaching Trump over his alleged role in inciting the storming of the Capitol. She voted against the second impeachment on January 13.

Defense 

In a July 2015 Washington Times profile, Jacqueline Klimas noted that Stefanik was the only freshman on that year's conference committee for the defense policy bill, a position accorded to her "because of her extensive experience in foreign policy—working in the George W. Bush administration, prepping Rep. Paul Ryan for his vice presidential debates, and listening to commanders at Fort Drum in her home district". Jack Collens, a political science professor at Siena College, told Klimas that Stefanik's prize committee position signaled that party leaders wanted Stefanik to be part of "the next generation of Republican leaders".

Environment 
Stefanik criticized Trump's decision to withdraw from the Paris climate agreement, saying it was "misguided" and "harms the ongoing effort to fight climate change, while also isolating us from our allies".

In January 2017, Stefanik joined the Bipartisan Climate Solutions Caucus, an apparent indication of "a moderate stance on climate change issues".

Health care 
On May 4, 2017, Stefanik voted on party lines in favor of repealing the Patient Protection and Affordable Care Act (Obamacare) and passing the House Republican-sponsored American Health Care Act.

Following a televised community forum in Plattsburgh four days later, at which many attendees opposed her vote and wanted to maintain Obamacare, Stefanik said she had been unfairly criticized for her vote for AHCA. She defended her vote in a post on Medium, "Setting the Record Straight on the American Health Care Act". Her claims about the effects of the AHCA were strongly disputed by fact checkers at the Glens Falls Post-Star, North Country Public Radio, and the Albany Times Union.

In 2017, Stefanik co-sponsored the Preserving Employee Wellness Programs Act in the 115th Congress—legislation that, among other things, would eliminate the genetic privacy protections of the Genetic Information Non-Discrimination Act of 2008 and allow companies to require employees to undergo genetic testing or risk paying a penalty of thousands of dollars, and let employers see that genetic and other health information. The American Society of Human Genetics opposes the bill.

In November 2017, Stefanik voted for the Championing Healthy Kids Act, which would provide a five-year extension to the Children's Health Insurance Program.

Immigration 
Stefanik opposed Trump's 2017 executive order imposing a temporary ban on travel and immigration to the United States by nationals of seven Muslim-majority countries.

Stefanik declined to condemn the Trump administration family separation policy, instead publishing a press release congratulating Trump after he signed an Executive Order to suspend new separations and detain families.

On March 26, 2019, Stefanik was one of 14 Republicans to vote with all House Democrats to override Trump's veto of a measure unwinding the latter's declaration of a national emergency at the southern border.

While previously supporting DACA, in 2021, Stefanik voted against the DREAM Act, which nine Republicans voted for.

Intelligence 

Stefanik voted to release the Nunes memo written by staff members of Representative Devin Nunes. Trump asserted that the memo discredited the investigation into Russian interference in the 2016 United States elections, but the Federal Bureau of Investigation asserted: "material omissions of fact ... fundamentally impact the memo's accuracy."

Stefanik supported the ending of the House Intelligence Committee's investigation into Russian interference in the 2016 United States elections over the objections of Committee Democrats.

Postal Service 
Stefanik was one of 26 Republicans to vote with the entire Democratic caucus in favor of a $25 billion relief bill for the US postal service at the height of the COVID-19 pandemic.

Taxes 
On December 19, 2017, Stefanik voted against the Tax Cuts and Jobs Act of 2017. In a December 18 Facebook post, she wrote, "The final bill does not adequately protect the state and local tax deduction that so many in our district and across New York rely on ... New York is one of the highest taxed states in the country, and families here rely on this important deduction to make ends meet."

Net neutrality 
After the Federal Communications Commission decided to repeal Obama-era net neutrality in December 2017, Stefanik urged her congressional colleagues to pass legislation restoring the policy.

Cybersecurity 
In September 2018, Stefanik, Seth Moulton and Dan Donovan co-sponsored the Cyber Ready Workforce Act advanced by Jacky Rosen. The legislation would create a grant program within the Department of Labor to "create, implement, and expand registered apprenticeships" in cybersecurity. It aims to offer certifications and connect participants with businesses, in order to "boost the number" of workers for federal jobs in that field.

LGBT rights 
In the 116th Congress, Stefanik was one of eight Republicans to vote for the Equality Act. Later in the same Congress, she introduced a bill, The Fairness for All Act, that would prohibit discrimination against LGBT people while also including exceptions for religious groups and small businesses with religious foundations. In the 117th Congress, Stefanik voted against the Equality Act on February 25, 2021, despite supporting the same legislation in the previous Congress.

In 2021, Stefanik co-sponsored the Fairness for All Act, the Republican alternative to the Equality Act. The bill would prohibit discrimination on the basis of sex, sexual orientation, and gender identity, and protect the free exercise of religion.

In 2015, Stefanik was one of 60 Republicans voting to uphold President Barack Obama's 2014 executive order banning federal contractors from making hiring decisions that discriminate based on sexual orientation or gender identity.

In 2016, Stefanik was one of 43 Republicans to vote for the Maloney Amendment to H.R. 5055, which would prohibit the use of funds for government contractors who discriminate against LGBT employees.

On July 19, 2022, Stefanik was one of the 47 Republican representatives who voted in favor of the Respect for Marriage Act, which would codify the right to same-sex marriage in federal law.

Voting rights 
Stefanik opposes the For the People Act. She made a false claim that the legislation would "prevent removal of ineligible voters from registration rolls." Both FactCheck.org and PolitiFact rated Stefanik's claim "False", with PolitiFact stating, "No section of the bill prevents an election official from removing an ineligible person on the voting rolls."

Women in politics 
Stefanik has long advocated for empowering women in the Republican Party and has influenced the party's culture to prioritize electing more women. After her election in 2014, Stefanik named Facebook COO Sheryl Sandberg as a major influence on her decision to run for Congress.

Controversies

QAnon 
In May 2022, Stefanik linked Democratic lawmakers to unnamed "pedo grifters" (i.e. pedophiles) in a tweet, adopting an attack strategy commonly associated with the QAnon conspiracy movement. She wrote: "The White House, House Dems, & usual pedo grifters are so out of touch with the American people". QAnon conspiracists posit, without evidence, that Democratic Party leaders maintain an international child sex trafficking ring.

False claims of 2020 election fraud 
In December 2020, one month after the 2020 US presidential election, Stefanik, in an interview with Newsmax, appeared to support Newsmax's baseless claim that Dominion Voting Systems had helped Joe Biden "steal" the election from Donald Trump. Newsmax had been promoting the theory but later issued a retraction after reaching a legal settlement with Dominion. Stefanik continued to make unsubstantiated claims about election fraud in public statements.

Stefanik joined over 100 GOP House members in an amicus brief asking the U.S. Supreme Court to overturn the 2020 election.

"Great Replacement" theory 

After the May 14, 2022, mass shooting in Buffalo, Representative Adam Kinzinger (R-IL) accused Stefanik of promoting "replacement theory" in some of her 2020 campaign ads, a reference to the racist "Great Replacement" conspiracy theory that the alleged shooter had cited. An adviser to Stefanik denied the accusation, calling it a "new disgusting low for the Left, their Never Trump allies, and the sycophant stenographers in the media."

Campaign support for George Santos 

During the 2022 election cycle, Stefanik was a strong early supporter of George Santos's campaign for U.S. representative from New York's 3rd district, on Long Island. She endorsed him in August 2021, lent him a staffer who played a major role in his campaign, and held a fundraiser for him in May 2022 that raised over $100,000. After Santos won the election, The New York Times and other media outlets reported that he had greatly misrepresented much of his background, including employers and schools he had no connection with, as well as aspects of his family history and ethnic background; in addition, there were personal details he had not shared, such as an active criminal case against him in Brazil. 

Some of Santos's campaign contributors who said they had given him large sums because of Stefanik's endorsement and support felt let down by her. "I assumed she did her homework", said one who gave more than $25,000 to Santos's campaign committees. Party operatives recalled that rumors about Santos's untruths had circulated since before Stefanik's endorsement, and believed it likely that she was aware of them at the time. Her campaign denied that, and someone CNN called a source close to her said, "One of the many reasons why Congresswoman Stefanik is the highest-ranking Republican in New York State is her operation focuses on winning and doesn't listen to these gossipy anonymous consultants."

Endorsement of Carl Paladino 

In 2022, Stefanik endorsed Carl Paladino in the election to succeed retiring U.S. representative Chris Jacobs in New York's 23rd congressional district. Stefanik reportedly had a history of disputes with Paladino's rival in the Republican primary, then-New York State Republican Committee chair Nick Langworthy. Paladino made comments on a radio show in 2021 praising Adolf Hitler, saying he was "the kind of leader we need today." Stefanik condemned Paladino's remarks but did not withdraw her endorsement. After Paladino called for the execution of Attorney General Merrick Garland, former Republican congresswoman Mia Love called upon Stefanik to rescind her endorsement of Paladino. Stefanik actively campaigned for Paladino, hosting a tele-rally for him the night before the primary. Paladino lost the primary to Langworthy.

Awards and recognition 
In 2020, Fortune magazine included Stefanik in its "40 Under 40" listing in the "Government and Politics" category.

Electoral history

See also 
 Women in the United States House of Representatives
 List of United States representatives from New York

References

External links 

 Representative Elise Stefanik official U.S. House website
 Elise Stefanik for Congress
 
 
 
 
 
 
 
 
 
 

|-

|-

|-

|-

1984 births
21st-century American politicians
21st-century American women politicians
21st-century Roman Catholics
American Roman Catholics
Catholics from New York (state)
Female members of the United States House of Representatives
George W. Bush administration personnel
Harvard University alumni
Living people
Politicians from Albany, New York
People from Essex County, New York
Republican Party members of the United States House of Representatives from New York (state)
Women in New York (state) politics